Hagiara is a Saharan desert oasis town in the Fezzan region of southwest Libya. Geographically it is located at the Sabha District, and is roughly 3.8 km south-east of the district's capital, Sabha.

References

See also 
 List of cities in Libya

Populated places in Sabha District
Oases of Libya